The Treaty of Paris (also known as the Treaty of Abbeville) was a treaty between Louis IX, King of France and Henry III, King of England, agreed to on 4 December 1259, ending 100 years of conflicts between the Capetian and Plantagenet dynasties.

History
In 1204, Philip II of France had forced King John out of continental Normandy, enforcing his 1202 claim that the lands were forfeit. However, Philip II had failed in his attempts to occupy the Norman islands in the Channel. Despite the 1217 Treaty of Lambeth, hostilities continued between the successive Kings of France and England until 1259.

Terms
Under the treaty, Henry acknowledged the loss of the Duchy of Normandy. Regarding the Norman islands in the channel, the treaty held that "islands (if any) which the King of England should hold" would be retained by him "as peer of France and Duke of Aquitaine" (the islands came to be collectively called the Channel Islands, consisting of Jersey, Guernsey, Alderney, Sark and some smaller islands).

Henry agreed to renounce control of Maine, Anjou and Poitou, which had been lost under the reign of King John, but remained Duke of Aquitaine, and he kept the lands of Gascony and parts of Aquitaine but only as a vassal to Louis.

In exchange, Louis withdrew his support for English rebels. He also ceded to Henry the bishoprics and cities of Limoges, Cahors and Périgueux and was to pay an annual rent for possession of Agenais.

Aftermath
Doubts on the treaty's interpretation began almost as soon as it was signed. The agreement resulted in the fact that the English kings had to pay homage liege to the French monarchs for territories on the continent. The situation did not help the friendly relationship between the two states, as it made two sovereigns of equal powers in their countries in fact unequal. According to the late Sorbonne Professor Édouard Perroy the Treaty of Paris, "...was at the very root of the Hundred Years' War."

See also
List of treaties

References

1259 in England
Paris (1259)
1250s in France
13th century in England
Paris
Paris (1259)
Medieval Paris
Henry III of England
13th-century military history of France
Louis IX of France
History of Normandy